Haymarket may refer to:

Places

Australia
 Haymarket, New South Wales, area of Sydney, Australia

Germany 
 Heumarkt (KVB), transport interchange in Cologne on the site of the Heumarkt (literally: hay market)

Russia
 Sennaya Square (Hay Square), Saint Petersburg

Sweden
 Hötorget, or Haymarket, city square in the center of Stockholm

United Kingdom
 Haymarket, London, a street in Westminster, London
 Theatre Royal Haymarket, theatre in London
 Haymarket, Newcastle, area in Newcastle city centre
 Haymarket bus station, bus station in Newcastle upon Tyne, above
 Haymarket Metro station, Metro station in Newcastle upon Tyne
 Haymarket, Edinburgh, area of Edinburgh, Scotland
 Haymarket railway station, railway station in Edinburgh, Scotland
 Haymarket Shopping Centre, shopping centre in Leicester
 Haymarket Theatre, theatre in Leicester

United States
 Haymarket, Virginia, town in Prince William County, Virginia
 Haymarket Square (Boston), a city square in Boston, Massachusetts
 Haymarket - Boston, an open-air market  several blocks from the historic square
 Haymarket (MBTA station), a metro station serving the above location in Boston
 Haymarket Theatre, theatre in Boston
 Haymarket Square (Chicago), a commercial area in Chicago, Illinois
 Haymarket (Louisville), former outdoor farmer's market in Louisville, Kentucky
 The Haymarket, one of the oldest neighborhoods in Lincoln, Nebraska

Others 
 Haymarket affair, 1886 incident at Haymarket Square in Chicago, Illinois
 Haymarket Books, non-profit publisher of left-wing literature in the United States
 Haymarket Media Group, a global media company